Mortimore may refer to:

Jim Mortimore, British science fiction writer
John Mortimore (cricketer) (1933–2014), former English cricketer
John Mortimore (footballer) (1934–2021), English former association football player and manager
Malcolm Mortimore (born 1953), drummer who has played with Gentle Giant, Spike Heatley, Tom Jones and many other artists
Michael Mortimore (1937–2017), British geographer and a prolific researcher of issues in the African drylands
Nathan Mortimore Newmark (1910–1981), American structural engineer and academic

See also
Mortimer